Panama participated in the 2015 Parapan American Games.

Competitors
The following table lists Panama's delegation per sport and gender.

Athletics

Men

Swimming

Men

References

2015 in Panamanian sport
Nations at the 2015 Parapan American Games
Panama at the Pan American Games